The Mystery of the Disappearing Cat (1944) is the second in the Five Find-Outers series of children's mystery novels by Enid Blyton. It was published by Methuen and Co Ltd and follows the first book in the series, The Mystery of the Burnt Cottage. It tells of a stolen cat the group of children work to uncover.

Plot
Luke, a friend of the Five Find-Outers, is working in Lady Candling's garden when her valuable Siamese cat is stolen. The Five Find-Outers and Dog work to solve the case.

Characters
The Main Characters
Elizabeth "Bets" Hliton — The youngest of the Five Find-Outers and Dog
Philip "Pip" Hilton— A member of the Five Find-Outers and Dog and Bets's brother
Lawrence "Larry" Daykin— The chief of the Five Find-Outers and Dog
Margaret "Daisy" Daykin— A member of the Five Find-Outers and Dog and Larry's sister. She is also the founder of The Five Find-Outers and Dog.
Frederick Algernon "Fatty" Trotteville —The smartest of the five Find-Outers and Dog He is also the leader of the group.
Buster — Fatty's Scottish Terrier dog
Mr Goon — the bumbling village Policeman who again fails to solve the case. Friend of Mr Tupping.
Suspects
Luke — Mr Tupping's assistant gardener of fifteen. Friend of the Five Find-Outers and Dog. Top suspect of stealing Lady Candling's best siamese cat, Dark Queen.
Lady Candling — The owner of the stolen valuable cat
Miss Harmer — The person who takes care of Lady Candling's cats
Miss Trimble — Lady Candling's companion, scared of the fierce Mr Tupping.
Mr. Tupping — The gardener of Lady Candling. Rude, bad tempered, fierce and cruel to Luke. Thinks he owns the garden.

Summary

It all takes place next door to Pip and Bets Hilton, when Lady Candling's prize cat, Dark Queen (a valuable siamese), disappears right under the nose of Luke, the gardener's help. Mr Tupping, (the gardener), is a nasty piece of work and the children immediately decide it would be great if he were the thief! But how could he be, if he wasn't even there when Dark Queen was stolen? All the evidence points to poor young Luke, Mr Tupping's helper, but the Find-Outers simply can't believe Luke is the thief.

There are a couple of other possible suspects in Lady Candling's staff, such as Miss Harmer the cat handler, and Miss Trimble, who takes care of the roses. They're all pretty sure it was Mr Tupping...but how on earth did he do it? The answer to the mystery is very simple and pretty clever. Mr Tupping stole Dark Queen in the morning, then painted a small patch of cream-colored paint to another cat's tail to disguise it as Dark Queen, whose tail was bitten by another cat, resulting in the creamy patch on its tail. Then he made Luke work beside the cage all day, so that he could be the top suspect of the case. In the afternoon, Mr Tupping hopped into the cage, rubbed the paint off the cat's tail with a rag soaked in turps, and then announced Dark Queen was gone! At last, Mr Tupping was caught and shown that he had been mixed up with dog thieving cases before.

External links
 
Enid Blyton Society page

1944 British novels
1944 children's books
British children's novels
Novels about cats
Novels by Enid Blyton
Methuen Publishing books